Kick III (stylized as KicK iii) is the sixth studio album by Venezuelan record producer and singer Arca. The album was scheduled to be released on 3 December 2021, but released early on 1 December 2021, through XL Recordings as a continuation to her 2020 record Kick I, and is the third entry in the Kick quintet. Kick II, Kick III, Kick IIII and Kick IIIII were released the same week. Kick III is supported by lead single "Incendio" and "Electra Rex". The album received positive reviews from critics.

Background 
Upon the release of Kick I, news surfaced that Arca would be releasing two more Kick albums to make a trilogy. The artist took to Pitchfork to say: "There will be four volumes. The third one is a little bit more introverted than Kick I, a little bit more like my self-titled album, I guess. The fourth one is piano only, no vocals. Right now, the least defined one, strangely, is the third one. It's all gestating right now [...] Each Kick exists in a kind of quantum state until the day that I send it to mastering. I try to not commit until I have to. But I have a vision for it. The second one is heavy on backbeats, vocal manipulation, mania, and craziness."

In the following year, Arca released her extended play Madre and took part in Dawn of Chromatica, a remix album by Lady Gaga, where she remixed the Ariana Grande collaboration "Rain on Me". While talking about the song on social media, Arca stated: "It's also the last time I playfully deconstruct my songs 'Time' and 'Mequetrefe', as we say goodbye to the Kick I era and move into the Kick II era and beyond". On September 27, the producer released the single "Incendio" to critical acclaim. Kick III was announced on November 9, alongside the single release of "Electra Rex". It was to be released the same day as Kick II. Arca's description of the album had updated significantly by this time, described as "a portal directly into the more manic, violently euphoric and aggressively psychedelic sound palettes in the series" and "the most incendiary entry in the Kick universe." With Kick IIII's announcement, Arca confirmed Kick III's sonic palette would focus "more on heavy club music".

The album was released early on 1 December 2021, one day after the release of Kick II. Its cover art was photographed by Frederik Heyman.

Composition
Kick III is a deconstructed club, glitch hop, psychedelic, reggaeton, cumbia, dance, and electronic noise album. Opener "Bruja" is "a ballroom track, filled with sass and contagious energy". "Incendio" is an industrial rap song that "showcases Ghersi’s sound design at its most inventive. Noises from passing vehicles get as much space as ballistic percussive clamor, and the rampage makes her shapeshifting vocal delivery—breathless quasi-raps, fiery shouts, childlike snickering—consistently hair-raising" "Rubberneck" is a blend of IDM and operatic pop and contains "punishing industrial thuds" and "a sense of controlled chaos". "Señorita" is a "glitchy" hip hop-inflected song that functions as the "record's punchy lyrical centerpiece". "Electra Rex" is "underpinned by a cavernous trap beat that makes way for syncopated percussions and combines the Greek mythological tragedies of Electra and Oedipus Rex. "Skullqueen "mimicks club-goers going out to catch some fresh air before heading back in the euphoric darkness of Arca’s glitch hop bash". Album closer "Joya" is a ballad that has been compared to Homogenic-era Björk and "closes iii on a note of all-encompassing peace".

Critical reception

On the review aggregate site Metacritic, Kick III received "generally favorable reviews" based on a weighted average score of 78 out of 100 from 14 critics. Red Dziri, writing for The Line of Best Fit called Kick III "one of [Arca]'s most accomplished works to date". The A.V. Clubs Max Freedman called "Incendio" the "clear peak" of the entire quintet. Safiya Hopfe of Exclaim! opined that "the album bears little narrative consistency—only expansions and distillations of sound which create an ambience so overpowering it is inescapable". However, the Evening Standard writer David Smyth called the project "hyperactive and jittery to a generally irritating extent".

Kick III was named the second best album of 2021 by The Atlantic, and was nominated for Best Electronic Album at the 2022 Libera Awards.

Track listing
All tracks written and produced by Arca, unless noted otherwise.

Release history

Charts

References 

2021 albums
Albums produced by Arca (musician)
Arca (musician) albums
XL Recordings albums
Reggaeton albums
Tecnocumbia albums
Psychedelic music albums
Noise music albums
Sequel albums